is a Japanese light novel series by Akinari Matsuno, with illustrations provided by the group QP:flapper made up of Tometa Ohara and Koharu Sakura. Media Factory published 12 novels under their MF Bunko J imprint between February 2007 and September 2010, including two side story volumes. The series was left unfinished due to the author's death on April 18, 2011. A manga adaptation by Issei Hyoju was serialized between the September 2008 and February 2012 issues of Media Factory's Monthly Comic Alive. A drama CD adaption was released by Edge Records on March 24, 2010 and its first-press limited edition came with a bonus CD. A 12-episode anime adaptation produced by Xebec aired between October and December 2010. Sentai Filmworks released the anime series on English-subtitled DVD in North America in September 2011, and then re-released it in February 2014 with an English dub on both DVD and Blu-ray.

Plot
Taro Sado is a masochist and goes to a high school with his male friend Tatsukichi Hayama. Taro falls in love for the first time with a girl and wants to be cured of his masochism so that he can confess his love to her, unaware at the time that she is actually his cross-dressing male friend Tatsukichi, so he goes to the Second Voluntary Club to get help. There he meets Mio Isurugi, a self-proclaimed goddess, and Arashiko Yuno, the girl who made him a masochist in the first place, however, she has androphobia. The club adviser is the school nurse, Michiru Onigawara. Other characters include Yumi Mamiya, Arashiko's best friend, and the president of the Inventors Club, Noa Hiragi, and her lolicon assistant, Himura Yukinojō.

Characters
 

 Taro Sado is the main protagonist of the story, and a true masochist. He went to the same middle school as Yūno, who he said is at fault for turning him into a masochist. He is not sexually attracted to his relatives, though his mother and older sister are attracted to him and have an overprotective relationship with him. He is sometimes forced to perform cross-dressing (in the anime, he was cross dressing because he was hypnotized by Mio, and fell in love with the male Tatsukichi, who tries to avoid Taro by cross dressing). Taro is known to have a ridiculous amount of "Pervert Energy" (over 30,000 units, compared to 5 units for average people) which was employed by Noa in one of her schemes. Despite the fact that he is a self-proclaimed "Super Masochist", Taro will not hesitate to help out his friends, such as rushing Mio to a hospital when she collapsed during their mock-wedding on their date, trying to beat up the senior who attempted to sexually assault Arashiko way back despite being outmatched, acknowledging Tatsukichi's cross-dressing, and telling him that he does not mind his interests. His first kiss was with Mio.

 

 Mio Isurugi is Taro Sado's senior. She is the head of his school club and is violent to Taro due to her superiority complex. She is a self-proclaimed deity, who apparently has ailurophobia. She is an extreme tsundere, and repeatedly attacks Taro, in an (unsuccessful) attempt to cure his masochism. She is shown to be very athletic, but has been said by Arashiko to not be very good at studies. There is an implication that she has feelings for Taro (as a result of his kindness towards her, plus the fact that he treats her just as he does with everybody else), although she does not admit it. It is suggested that she became jealous when another girl makes advances towards Taro, as in the case of her being more violent towards him when Noa gave him a mound of lilacs. She seems to be unaware of the fact that she has developed an attachment towards Taro, nor the fact that she has unconsciously developed feelings towards him, and constantly denies these facts whenever Arashiko has pointed it out. Her first kiss was with Taro.
Mio does not get along well with Tatsukichi when his alter-ego surfaces while cross-dressing, especially from the fact that Tatsukichi belittles Mio's bust size whenever his alter-ego comes out. She does not quite realize that she has an innate sadistic personality, which may explain why she constantly resorts to violent measures to cure his masochism.

 

 Yuno is Taro Sado's classmate. She has androphobia, due to an attempted sexual assault by her former boyfriend in junior high school, and will attack any male who touches her, subconsciously feeling that she has to hit them before they hit her. She is apparently the one who caused Taro to become a masochist but, despite her androphobia, develops a crush on him, and is also hinted to be jealous as well when another girl is involved with Taro.
She occasionally gets into situations where she briefly forgets her androphobia in her eagerness to get closer to Taro (or is accidentally touched by him), and when she actually realizes what happens, she comically assaults Taro who, due to his masochism, enjoys it.

 

 Hayama is Taro Sado's classmate and close friend. He enjoys cross-dressing (which induces his female alter-ego "Tatsumi Antoinette XVI" to appear). He is troubled at the start when Taro, who does not know of Tatsukichi's hobby, becomes infatuated with his female alter ego. While cross-dressing, his alter-ego has a superiority complex, and repeatedly argues with Isurugi (sometimes over Taro's affection), as well as verbally attacking Mio's breast size repeatedly. He was previously in a relationship with Yuno's best friend Yumi, but states that he is now unsure how he feels about her.

 

 Mamiya is Yuno's light pink haired best friend who is skilled in massaging. She hates Taro and loves Tatsukichi, but does not know that Tatsukichi is a cross-dresser. In certain scenes in the anime, it is implied that she has lesbian tendencies when groping and fondling Arashiko and Mio.

 

 Onigawara is a school nurse at Taro's school who enjoys making people to perform cosplay. She is something of a sadist and has a close relationship to Mio, to the point that Mio calls her "Michiru-nee". She is shown to enjoy taking pictures of pretty girls, especially when they're wearing costumes she created for them. She also knows that Mio, Arashiko and Noa have feelings for Taro, and usually places competitions where he is the prize.

 

 Hiiragi is a senior of Taro. She was introduced in Volume 5 of the original light novel. Her body looks like a preadolescent girl. She is the president of the Invention Club at Taro's school, and is a genius with an IQ of over 200. Due to her insecurities at not being able to lead a normal life, she comes up with a scheme which would turn everyone in the world into perverts (if they were not already one). However, she is talked out of it by Taro, and is saved by him when the broken machine threatens to fall on her. Since then, she falls for Taro, since he happens to be her first love (she gave him a mound of lilacs which was, as stated by Arashiko, holds the meaning of first love in the language of flowers.) Like Mio, she dislikes people insulting her childish stature.

 
 
 He is Noa's assistant who is quite handsome and is known to be a lolicon. Himura loves Noa because of her body and that is the sole reason for him joining the Invention Club.

 
 
 Shizuka is Taro's older sister with an extreme brother complex. She shows extreme love for Taro, and has a habit of treating him like a little baby. She is crazy when it comes to his love life and is joked to being infatuated with him. Despite looking like a middle-schooler, she is actually a college student.

 
 
 Tomoko is Taro's mother who is very overprotective of her son, to the point where she would conspire with her daughter Shizuka, even though she is her "rival" to Taro's heart whenever a girl comes into his life besides them. She is obsessed with Taro in protecting him and comically sometimes joked to the point of being infatuated with him. She adds the "-san" suffix to both her children's names.

 
 Nanaha is Taro Sado's cousin. She was introduced in Volume 6 of the original novel series. She is a junior high school student who sometimes visits Taro's room, making Shizuka and Tomoko angry. Although first cousins can marry under the family law in Japan, Taro is not sexually attracted to Nanaha because he treats her as a member of the family. Nanaha is hated by Shizuka and Tomoko, and they treat her very badly.

 
 
 The manager of the store in which Taro works at. He is known to have a fetish for 2D girls and is heard to have called his assorted merchandise of 2D beauties as his "wives".

Media

Print
MM! began as a light novel series written by Akinari Matsuno, with illustrations by the group QP:flapper made up of Tometa Ohara and Koharu Sakura. Media Factory published 12 volumes between February 23, 2007 and September 24, 2010 under their MF Bunko J imprint; 10 comprise the main story, while the other two are side story collections. The series was left unfinished due to the author's death on April 18, 2011. The novels are also published by Tong Li Publishing in Taiwan.

A manga adaptation illustrated by Issei Hyoju was serialized between the September 2008 and February 2012 issues of Media Factory's Monthly Comic Alive. The chapters were collected into seven tankōbon volumes published between February 23, 2009 and March 23, 2012.

Anime
A 12-episode anime television series adaptation produced by Xebec, written by Rie Koshika, and directed by Tsuyoshi Nagasawa aired in Japan between October 2 and December 18, 2010 on AT-X. The series was released on six BD/DVD compilation volumes between December 22, 2010 and May 25, 2011. Bonus shorts titled SS! were included on the BD/DVD volumes. Sentai Filmworks licensed the anime for distribution North America and released a Japanese language DVD set with English subtitles of the anime series on September 13, 2011. English-language versions on DVD and Blu-ray Disc was released on February 11, 2014. The Japanese-language version of the series was posted on the Anime Network website for online streaming in 2011 and the English-language version was added in January 2014. The series began streaming on Hulu in 2014.

The series has two opening themes and two ending themes. The first opening theme is "Help!! (Hell side)" by Ayana Taketatsu and is used for the first four episodes, and the second opening theme is "Help!! (Heaven side)" by Taketatsu and Saori Hayami for the subsequent episodes. The main ending theme is "More-more Lovers!!" by Natsuko Aso and is used for the first 11 episodes. The second ending theme is "Happy Birthday, my holy day" by Taketatsu and is used for episode 12. The insert song  by Hayami was used in episode nine. Two character song singles were released for Mio (Taketatsu) on December 15, 2010, and Arashiko (Hayami) on January 26, 2011. The anime's original soundtrack was released on December 22, 2010.

Episode list

References

External links
Anime official website 
MM! at Anime Network

2007 Japanese novels
2008 manga
2010 Japanese television series endings
Anime and manga based on light novels
Cross-dressing in anime and manga
Harem anime and manga
Media Factory manga
MF Bunko J
Kadokawa Dwango franchises
School life in anime and manga
Seinen manga
Sentai Filmworks
Light novels
Unfinished novels
Xebec (studio)